Deotala is a small village of Bangladesh. It's situated in the Nayanshree union of Nawabgonj upazila of Dhaka District.

See also
 List of villages in Bangladesh

References

Villages in Dhaka District